Strat-O-Matic Computer Baseball is a 1986 video game published by Strat-O-Matic.

Gameplay
Strat-O-Matic Computer Baseball is a game in which the Strat-O-Matic Baseball board game is adapted.

Reception
Duane E. Widner reviewed the game for Computer Gaming World, and stated that "For statistical accuracy, few games have ever reached the level enjoyed by Strat-O-Matic."

Win Rogers reviewed version 3.0 of the game for Computer Gaming World, and stated that "Any baseball enthusiast with a strong interest in statistics should take a look at this absorbing program, if only to understand other computer simulations better. In fact, those who have no interest in graphics and simply want a satisfying statistical simulation may find Strat-O-Matic Computer Baseball (Version 3.0) to be the best baseball program of all."

Reviews
Computer Gaming World #94
Game Players PC Entertainment (May 1993)
Electronic Entertainment (April 1994)

References

1986 video games